"Fortune Teller" is a song written by Allen Toussaint under the pseudonym Naomi Neville and first recorded by Benny Spellman. It was issued in 1962 as B-side of the single "Lipstick Traces (on a Cigarette)" on Minit Records (Cat 644).

It tells the story of a young man who is pleased to learn from a fortune teller that he will find love "When the next one arrives".  Next day he returns, angry that nothing has happened, but falls in love with the fortune teller. They get married and are as "happy as we could be", and he gets his "fortune told for free".

Cover versions 
Many artists have covered the song, including the Rolling Stones, the Hollies and the Who. It was included on the October 2007 album Raising Sand, by Robert Plant and Alison Krauss.

The song was also a hit in Australia, recorded by the Throb; released in February 1966 and charted in the top 5 in Adelaide, Brisbane, Melbourne and Sydney.

The song is included as a part of a medley performed by Allen Toussaint of some of his hits in the 2005 documentary film Make It Funky!, which presents a history of New Orleans music and its influence on rhythm and blues, rock and roll, funk and jazz.

References

External links
 Song lyrics at 1songlyrics.com

1962 songs
1962 singles
1967 singles
Songs written by Allen Toussaint
Minit Records singles